Mitcham Junction is a National Rail station served by Southern and Thameslink trains, and a Tramlink stop. It is in the London Borough of Merton and is in Travelcard Zone 4.

The station opened on 1 October 1868 specifically to provide an interchange between the new "South London & Sutton Junction Railway", later re-branded as part of the Portsmouth Line, and the existing "Wimbledon & Croydon Railway".

Despite its name, Mitcham Junction is no longer a railway junction; one of the lines that crossed here (the W&CR) has become a grade-separated tramline, the Croydon Tramlink.

The platforms can accommodate 7 coaches. For longer trains selective door opening is used.

Location
Mitcham Junction is not near the centre of Mitcham but on Mitcham Common next to Mitcham Golf Club, and not far from the historic Cricket Green Conservation Area.

Services

National Rail
National Rail services at Mitcham Junction are operated by Southern and Thameslink using  and  EMUs.

The typical off-peak service in trains per hour is:

 2 tph to 
 2 tph to  via 
 2 tph to 

During the peak hours, additional services between London Victoria and Epsom also call at the station.

On Saturday evenings (after approximately 18:45) and on Sundays, there is no service south of Dorking to Horsham.

London Trams
London Trams operate services at Mitcham Junction using Bombardier CR4000 and Stadler Variobahn Trams.

The typical off-peak service in trams per hour is:
 6 tph to  via 
 6 tph to  via West Croydon
 12 tph to 

The stop is also served by a number of early morning and late evening services to and from New Addington.

Connections
London Buses routes 127 and S1 serve the station and tram stop.

References

External links

Tramlink stops in the London Borough of Merton
Railway stations in the London Borough of Merton
Former London, Brighton and South Coast Railway stations
Railway stations in Great Britain opened in 1868
Railway stations served by Govia Thameslink Railway